Diana Rae Martin  (7 February 1942 – 31 December 2019) was a New Zealand microbiologist. She was a Fellow of the Royal Society Te Apārangi from 2000, and was made an Officer of the New Zealand Order of Merit for services to microbiology in 2008.

Early life and education 
Martin was born Diana Rae France in Wellington on 7 February 1942, the daughter of Udall and Thelma France. She followed a Bachelor of Science in 1963 from the University of Otago with an MSc(Hons) in microbiology in 1965, with a thesis titled Observations on the distribution and bacteriophage typing of the genus proteus. 

She worked for the National Health Institute in Wellington for two years, and then in 1968 moved to the Central Public Health Laboratory in London, where she was in charge of the Pseudomonas Laboratory. During her time in London, she obtained her PhD on microbial epidemiology from the University of London, submitting her thesis, Variation in Pseudomonas aeruginosa, in 1971.

Research 
Martin returned to New Zealand in 1972, where she initially worked for Wellington Polytechnic as a microbiology tutor, until 1975. After this point she worked for the National Health Institute, the New Zealand Communicable Disease Centre and the Institute of Environmental Science and Research (ESR). Martin was instrumental in the creation of the Group B meningococcal OMV vaccine (MeNZB) for New Zealand. She retired in 2011.

Honours and awards 
Martin was elected a Fellow of the Royal Society Te Apārangi in 2000. In the 2008 Queen's Birthday Honours, she was appointed an Officer of the New Zealand Order of Merit, for services to microbiology.

Personal life
In 1969, she married Peter David Martin, a respiratory physician. In the 2016 Queen's Birthday Honours, Peter Martin was appointed an Officer of the New Zealand Order of Merit, for services to tobacco control.

Diana Martin died on 31 December 2019 after a "long, debilitating illness". She was survived by her husband and two children.

Selected works

References 

1942 births
2019 deaths
Fellows of the Royal Society of New Zealand
New Zealand microbiologists
University of Otago alumni
Scientists from Wellington City
Alumni of the London School of Hygiene & Tropical Medicine
New Zealand women scientists
Officers of the New Zealand Order of Merit